Kam Air operates three scheduled international flights from Kabul, to Abu Dhabi, Dubai, and Islamabad. All flights to and from Kabul were stopped following the Fall of Kabul on 15 August 2021. The Kabul–Abu Dhabi service was the first to resume, on 20 October 2021.

List

References

Lists of airline destinations